Wiśniowo Ełckie  is a village in the administrative district of Gmina Prostki, within Ełk County, Warmian-Masurian Voivodeship, in northern Poland. It is located in the historic region of Masuria.

The village has a population of 890.

History
The origins of the village date back to 1486, when Gotard Korbowski was granted 66 włókas of land to establish a village. As of 1600, the population was solely Polish.

Under Nazi Germany, the village was renamed Kölmersdorf to erase traces of Polish origin, and was the location of two labour camps of the Reich Labour Service. Following World War II, in 1945, the village became again part of Poland, and its historic Polish name was restored with the addition of the adjective Ełckie after the nearby county seat of Ełk to distinguish it from other villages of the same name.

References

Villages in Ełk County
15th-century establishments in Poland
Populated places established in the 1480s